The Second Valls government was the thirty-eighth government in the French Fifth Republic.

It was led by Manuel Valls, who was appointed Prime Minister of France on 27 August 2014; it consisted of 15 ministers from the Socialist Party (PS) and 2 from the Radical Party of the Left (PRG).

Following Valls's decision to focus on his campaign for the Socialist Party presidential primary, he resigned from his functions on 6 December 2016. The government was succeeded by the Cazeneuve government.

Prime Minister

Ministers

Secretaries of State

Changes
 On 4 September 2014, Thomas Thévenoud, Secretary of State for Foreign Trade, Tourism and French overseas, resigns following problems with the tax authorities. He is replaced by Matthias Fekl.
 On 21 November 2014, Kader Arif, Secretary of State for Veterans, resigns  following an investigation into public procurement awards. He is replaced by Jean-Marc Todeschini.
 On 17 June 2015, Geneviève Fioraso, Secretary of State for Higher Education and Research, resigned for health reasons. She is replaced by Thierry Mandon. The latter, until now Secretary of State for State Reform and Simplification, is himself replaced by Clotilde Valter. Carole Delga, Secretary of State for Trade, Crafts, Consumer and Social Economy and Solidarity, resigns. She is a candidate for regional elections in Occitanie. She is replaced by Martine Pinville.
 On 2 September 2015, François Rebsamen, Minister of Labour, Employment and Social Dialogue, announced his resignation following his election as mayor of Dijon. He is replaced by Myriam El Khomri.
 On 27 January 2016, Christiane Taubira, Minister of Justice and Keeper of the Seals, announced his resignation. She is replaced by Jean-Jacques Urvoas.
 On 11 February 2016, Laurent Fabius, Minister of Foreign Affairs and International Development, resigns following his election as president of Constitutional Council . He is replaced by Jean-Marc Ayrault, former Prime Minister. Marylise Lebranchu, Minister of Decentralisation, State Reform and Public Service, is replaced by Annick Girardin. The latter, until now Secretary of State Development and Francophonie, is himself replaced by André Vallini. Fleur Pellerin, Minister of Culture and Communication, is replaced by Audrey Azoulay. Sylvia Pinel, Minister of Housing and Territorial Development, announced his resignation following his election as vice-president of Regional council of Occitanie. She is replaced by Emmanuelle Cosse. Clotilde Valter, Secretary of State for State Reform and Simplification becomes Secretary of State for Vocational Training and Apprenticeship. She is replaced by Jean-Vincent Placé.
 On 27 January 2016, George Pau-Langevin, Minister of Overseas France, resigned. She is replaced by Ericka Bareigts. Emmanuel Macron, Minister of Economy, Industry and Digital Affairs, announced his resignation following to devote himself to his political movement, En Marche!.

References

External links
 French Government composition

2014 establishments in France
Cabinets established in 2014
Cabinets disestablished in 2016
François Hollande
French governments
2016 disestablishments in France